Avin-e Sofla (also Romanized as Āvīn-e Soflá; also known as Āvīn-e Pā’īn and Avin Pa’in) is a village in Fin Rural District, Fin District, Bandar Abbas County, Hormozgan Province, Iran. At the 2006 census, its population was 112, in 24 families.

References 

Populated places in Bandar Abbas County